Cerathosia is a genus of moths of the family Noctuidae.

Species
 Cerathosia opistochra Dyar, 1916
 Cerathosia tricolor Smith, 1887

References
 Cerathosia at Markku Savela's Lepidoptera and Some Other Life Forms
 Natural History Museum Lepidoptera genus database

Acontiinae